9/4 may refer to:
September 4 (month-day date notation)
April 9 (day-month date notation)
A type of enneagram